Interstate 469 (I-469) is an Interstate Highway in northeastern Indiana. It is an auxiliary route of parent I-69 that also carries portions of US Highway 24 (US 24), US 30, and US 33 around the urban parts of Fort Wayne. The Interstate was originally conceived as a bypass for US 24 around the south and east ends of Fort Wayne. Due to heavy traffic on US 30 through the city, support was gained to connect the bypass to I-69 on the city's north end. I-469 was given the name Ronald Reagan Expressway in 2005.

I-469 was the most expensive civic project in the history of Allen County, costing over $207 million (equivalent to $ in ). As a bypass route, I-469 has been ineffective at helping with north–south traffic along I-69. However, the route has served effectively as an east–west bypass around the city, removing heavy truck traffic from passing through Fort Wayne.

Route description

I-469 begins at I-69 exit 296 and Lafayette Center Road in southwestern Allen County. The freeway heads east as a four-lane freeway, running concurrently with US 33. The highway begins to turn southeast, passing through farmland. The route has a diamond interchange at Lafayette Center Road East and at Indianapolis Road, before turning due east and passing just south of Fort Wayne International Airport. The next interchange is at the northern terminus of the southern section of State Road 1 (SR 1) and serves the airport via Bluffton Road. After curving northeasterly, I-469 has an interchange with Winchester Road and another with US 27. At the interchange with US 27, US 33 leaves I-469 heading south concurrently with US 27.

The freeway then curves northeasterly, with interchanges at Marion Center Road and Tillman Road. Then, I-469 passes southeast of New Haven, with an interchange at Minnich Road. After the Minnich Road exit, the road begins to curve due north along the east side of New Haven. The freeway has an interchange with US 30/SR 930 at SR 930's eastern terminus; US 30 begins running concurrently with I-469. After the interchange at US 30 is a bridge over Norfolk Southern railroad tracks and an interchange with US 24. This is the eastern end of the concurrency with US 24.

I-469 proceeds north, concurrent with both US 24 and US 30. The freeway crosses the Maumee River and begins to curve to the northwest, entering commercial areas. The next interchange is with the southern terminus of the northern section of SR 37, after which the route enters residential areas with a small amount of farmland. The highway then curves further west to an interchange at Maplecrest Road. At I-469's northern terminus, it has an interchange with I-69 and an exit-only ramp to Auburn Road; US 24 and US 30 continue to the south along I-69.

Traffic flow 
I-469 is maintained by the Indiana Department of Transportation (INDOT). , I-469's traffic count was 46,161 vehicles per day, on average between Maplecrest Road and I-469's northern terminus, 34,651 near its interchange with US 30, 14,821 near its interchange with Marion Center Road, and 22,142 between the highway's southern terminus and its interchange with Lafayette Center Road East. By comparison, in 2017, I-69 saw over 60,000 vehicles per day in a majority of sections between the termini of I-469.

A 2007 traffic count along I-469 found that only one section of the highway, between Maplecrest Road and I-469's northern terminus, saw traffic numbers close to anywhere along I-69's route around the city, while other sections are much more lightly traveled. John Stafford, who formerly worked for Allen County Plan Commission during planning for I-469, stated in 2008 that the highway was relatively new and would eventually spur growth. Since its construction, I-469 has been ineffective as a north–south bypass around Fort Wayne, in part because its length is  longer than I-69's route around the city. However, officials have stated that heavy truck traffic along Coliseum Boulevard has almost entirely disappeared, and some have stated that I-469 functions better as an east–west bypass around Fort Wayne.

History

In the 1950s, Coliseum Boulevard was built as a "circumurban" highway, and US 30 was rerouted onto it to bypass the downtown area of Fort Wayne. I-69 was constructed in the 1960s around the west side of the city; its first section opened in October 1962. In 1970, Eli Samaan created a transportation plan for Fort Wayne, including north–south and east–west expressways through the city, along with a route along the city's south and east edges. Fort Wayne mayor Ivan Lebamoff supported the east–west expressway, and the route was approved by the state. However, the estimated $110 million needed for the project could not be allocated, so the project was scrapped. When the state began looking for a solution to traffic issues on US 24 through Fort Wayne, plans for a bypass began. In large part due to heavy traffic on Coliseum Boulevard, which became known for its commercial properties and issues with bottlenecks, the idea gained support.

The original plans for the bypass were to connect I-69 to US 24 east of Fort Wayne. By 1981, these plans were expanded to connect to I-69 on the city's north side. Samaan stated that he had to convince Governor Otis Bowen in 1978 to expedite construction of the bypass. An additional factor appeared as contracts for the project were being awarded, when General Motors announced construction of an automotive plant in 1984 on Lafayette Center Road, where the bypass was planned to interchange with I-69. According to Samaan, this helped to accelerate construction when the state decided it would be beneficial to the new employer in the area, stating "I never have seen anything move that fast in my whole life."

Construction began in 1988, with the first section built between I-69 and Lafayette Center Road. In June 1989, the US 24 bypass received the I-469 designation. A temporary halt to construction occurred in 1991 when crews unearthed a lock that was once used in the Wabash and Erie Canal while constructing the interchange with US 24 east of New Haven. Upon the highway's completion in 1995, its construction was the most expensive in Allen County's history, with a cost of $207 million (equivalent to $ in ). In 1998, US 24 and US 30 were rerouted onto I-69 and I-469. In 2005, I-469 was given the name Ronald Reagan Expressway, in honor of the former US president.

Future
In early 2019, INDOT began construction on a project to reconfigure the interchange with US 24 in New Haven. With the completion of the Fort-to-Port project in 2012, US 24 is now a freeway from I-469 to the Ohio state line, except for the folded diamond interchange at I-469 that has traffic lights at the ramp terminals. The reconstructed I-469/US 24 interchange will be a partial cloverleaf configuration with a flyover ramp from US 24 westbound to I-469 southbound, thereby enabling free flow of traffic through the interchange when construction is completed in late 2020. Reconfiguration of the interchange was included in the 2002 final environmental impact statement and record of decision for the Fort-to-Port project, but its construction was deferred at the time due to funding issues.

Exit list

References

External links

 Kurumi.com entry
 Interstate-guide.com entry

69-4
69-4
4
Transportation in Allen County, Indiana
Transportation in Fort Wayne, Indiana